Anna Elisabeth of Saxe-Lauenburg (23 August 1624 in Ratzeburg – 27 May 1688 in Butzbach), was a duchess of Saxe-Lauenburg by birth and by marriage landgravine of Hesse-Homburg.

Life 
Anna Elizabeth was a daughter of Duke Augustus of Saxe-Lauenburg (1577-1656) and his first wife Elisabeth Sophie (1599-1627), the daughter of the Duke John Adolf of Holstein-Gottorp.

She married on 2 April 1665 in Lübeck to Landgrave William Christoph of Hesse-Homburg (1625-1681).  For William Christoph, it was his second marriage.  Only two daughters from his first marriage to Sophia Eleonore of Hesse-Darmstadt had survived and it was hoped that the marriage with Anna Elisabeth would produce an heir.  The princess, whom the Landgrave only knew from a portrait, was annoyed to learn that she was physically challenged and unable to bear children.  He married her, as he had promised, but soon sought a divorce.  The divorce was pronounced in 1672.  According to some source, he had hoped for a huge dowry, however, the dowry she brought in was rather modest.  According to this theory, when her money had been used up, William Christoph called her unfit and filed for a divorce.

Anna Elisabeth received Philippseck Castle near Butzbach as her residence.  She engaged in poor relief and founded schools in Bodenrod and Maibach.  She died in Butzbach on 27 May 1688, at the age of 64, and was buried in the crypt below the choir of the church in Münster (a district of Butzbach).

References 
 Archiv für hessische Geschichte und Altertumskunde, p. 408 ff (Online)
 Peter von Kobbe: Geschichte und Landesbeschreibung des Herzogthums Lauenburg, vol. 3, Harro von Hirschheydt, 1837, p. 35 ff

House of Ascania
1624 births
1688 deaths
German duchesses
Landgravines of Hesse-Darmstadt
Daughters of monarchs